Britt Wadner (16 January 16, 1915 Linköping - 13 March 1987 Båstad) was a Swedish pirate radio manager.

Career 
In 1959, she became an ad manager for Radio Syd. In 1962, the Pirate Radio Act (also called "Lex Radio Nord") was introduced in Sweden, which banned ownership of radio transmitters and also prohibited broadcasts from international waters if they disrupted Swedish Radio. She purchased her boat Cheeta I, and continued broadcasting.

In 1966, she moved to Gambia, where she was involved in radio and tourism and was also allowed to broadcast from land.

Imprisonment
Wadner was sentenced three times for violation of the law, the last time being given three months in prison. The sentence was served at the Hinseberg women's prison.

Further reading

See also 
 Pirate radio in Europe

References 

1987 deaths
1915 births
Swedish models